Marie-Galante Passage is a strait in the Caribbean. It separates the island of Marie-Galante, from Guadeloupe island and Îles des Saintes.

References

Geography of Marie-Galante
Straits of Guadeloupe